S. L. Wong  may refer to:

S. L. Wong
S. L. Wong (phonetic symbols), IPA-based transcription scheme written by Wong Shik Ling
S. L. Wong (romanisation), Romanisation scheme written by Wong Shik Ling